Mīrānshāh (Pashto and ) or Mīrāmshāh is a small town that is the administrative headquarters of North Waziristan District, Khyber Pakhtunkhwa province of Pakistan. Miranshah lies on the banks of the Tochi River in a wide valley surrounded by the foothills of the Hindu Kush mountains.

The city has a shrinking population of only 4,361, and it has only 356 households. This makes it the least populous urban area in Bannu Division, but it is also the only urbanized area in the entire region of North Waziristan, and also the entire Waziristan region, a mountainous area that has 99% of its 1.22 million residents living in rural areas.

Administration

Miranshah is the administrative headquarters of North Waziristan District, in the former Federally Administered Tribal Areas of Pakistan (FATA). In 2018, FATA was merged into the Khyber Pakhtunkhwa province of Pakistan.

History

Miranshah was named after the Timurid ruler, Miran Shah, the son of Timur.  

In 1905, the British constructed Miranshah Fort to control North Waziristan.

In the early 1950s, the Pakistan Air Force (PAF) and the "Tochi Scouts" of Pakistan's paramilitary Frontier Corps carried out counter-insurgency operations from Miranshah Airfield and Miranshah Fort against the insurgency fomented by the rebellious General Shudikhel Dawar and Mirzali Khan (Faqir of Ipi). In the 1950s, Miranshah was also the site of a weapons firing range of the PAF, which was located next to the Miranshah Airfield.

After 9/11, Miranshah gained prominence in the United States-led War on Terror and has witnessed numerous drone strikes by the US Central Intelligence Agency targeting alleged militants hiding in the town and in the surrounding foothills. Miranshah and its surrounding areas have also witnessed fighting between militants and Pakistani military and paramilitary forces.

Notable places

Miranshah has a historical fort built by the British in 1905, which, since Pakistan's independence on 14 August 1947, has been used as a garrison by the "Tochi Scouts" of Pakistan's Frontier Corps. The town also has a 7,000 ft. long airfield, which is used for both civil and military purposes. 

Other notable places include a bazaar, a sports stadium, a primary school, a secondary school and a college.

See also

 Waziristan
 North Waziristan District
 Bannu Division
 Bannu

References

External links

 Waziristan and Mughal empire
 Nehru in Waziristan
 Sketch map of Waziristan
 Mehsuds and Wazirs, the King-makers in a game of thrones
 Lawrence of Arabia in Waziristan

Populated places in North Waziristan
Waziristan